Distemonanthus is a genus of flowering plants in the family Fabaceae. It belongs to the subfamily Dialioideae. It contains a single species, Distemonanthus benthamianus, a deciduous tree, which occurs widely but sparsely in the forest regions of Tropical West and Central Africa; it is sometimes confused with Pericopsis laxiflora due to similar morphological features.

Mature heartwood has a moderate resistance to fungi.

Description
A big tree, it grows up to 40 meters tall and 90 cm in diameter. Trunk is straight but can sometimes be slightly sinuous; fairly spreading buttress roots at the base, free of branches for up to 20 meters. Bark, brown -  reddish brown. Leaves, pinnately compound arrangement, 7 - 10 leaflets. Leaf-blade, ovate - elliptical in outline. Fruit, indehiscent pods

Distribution
Tree grows in the high forest of West and Central Africa. Occurs in Gabon, Central African Republic, Nigeria, Ghana, Cameroon. In Gabon, it is known as Movingui.

Uses
Parts of the root is used as a chewing stick for dental hygiene in parts of Nigeria. Bark extracts are used to treat incidents of diarrhea by traditional health practitioners. Used also for decorative veneers and joinery.

References

Dialioideae
Monotypic Fabaceae genera